Thomas M. Allen was a Baptist preacher who served as a representative in the Georgia Assembly during the Reconstruction Era. He was African American. He was elected in the 1868, representing Jasper county as a Republican. Allen escaped assassination by the Ku Klux Klan after they murdered his brother-in-law by mistake during their attempt on his life.

References

African-American state legislators in Georgia (U.S. state)
Original 33
African-American politicians during the Reconstruction Era
Georgia (U.S. state) Republicans
19th-century American politicians
Victims of the Ku Klux Klan
Year of birth missing
Year of death missing
Ku Klux Klan in Georgia (U.S. state)